John Scott Werry  is a New Zealand psychiatry academic and as of 2021 is an emeritus professor at the University of Auckland.

Academic career

After graduating in medicine at the University of Otago, Werry worked in Montreal Childrens Hospital and University of Illinois in North America before returning to New Zealand and the  University of Auckland where he rose to emeritus professor.

In the 2009 New Year Honours, Werry was appointed a Companion of the New Zealand Order of Merit, for services to child and adolescent psychiatry.

In July 2021, in the context of a review of the NCEA (New Zealand's National Curriculum), Clements, along with six other University of Auckland Professors and Emeritus Professors published a controversial letter "In Defence of Science" in the New Zealand Listener.

Selected works 
 Volkmar, Fred R., Ami Klin, Bryna Siegel, Peter Szatmari, Catherine Lord, Magda Campbell, B. J. Freeman et al. "Field trial for autistic disorder in DSM-IV." The American journal of psychiatry (1994).
 WERRY, JOHN SCOTT, Jon M. McClellan, and Linda Chard. "Childhood and adolescent schizophrenic, bipolar, and schizoaffective disorders: a clinical and outcome study." Journal of the American Academy of Child & Adolescent Psychiatry 30, no. 3 (1991): 457–465.
 Reeves, Jan C., John S. Werry, Gail S. Elkind, and Alan Zametkin. "Attention deficit, conduct, oppositional, and anxiety disorders in children: II. Clinical characteristics." Journal of the American Academy of Child & Adolescent Psychiatry 26, no. 2 (1987): 144–155.
 Weiss, Gabrielle, Klaus Minde, John S. Werry, Virginia Douglas, and Elizabeth Nemeth. "Studies on the hyperactive child: VIII. Five-year follow-up." Archives of General Psychiatry 24, no. 5 (1971): 409–414.
 Werry, John S. "Developmental hyperactivity." Pediatric Clinics of North America 15, no. 3 (1968): 581–599.

References

Living people
Year of birth missing (living people)
University of Illinois Urbana-Champaign faculty
Academic staff of the University of Auckland
New Zealand psychiatrists
Companions of the New Zealand Order of Merit
University of Illinois faculty